Lesa may refer to:

People
 Falema‘i Lesa, Samoan individual who famously appealed a New Zealand overstay
 Lesa Amoore, American model and photographer
 Lesa Cline-Ransome, American author
 Lesa Kennedy (born 1961), American executive
 Lesa Lewis (born 1967), American bodybuilder
 Lesa Mayes-Stringer (born 1968), Canadian bobsledder 
 Lesa Ní Mhunghaile, Irish academic and scholar
 Lesa Roe, American aerospace engineer
 Lesa Semmler, Canadian politician

Places
 Lesa, Piedmont, Italy
 LESA, ICAO code for Salamanca Airport, Spain

Other
 LESA, proposed NASA moon base under the Apollo Applications Program

See also
 Lesa Lesa, 2003 Indian Tamil-language film